Lists of record labels cover record labels, brands or trademarks associated with marketing of music recordings and music videos. The lists are organized alphabetically, by genre, by company and by location.

Alphabetical

List of record labels: 0–9
List of record labels: A–H 
List of record labels: I–Q
List of record labels: R–Z

By genre
Bing Crosby's record labels after 1955
List of Christian record labels
List of electronic music record labels
List of hip hop record labels
List of tango music labels

By company
List of Sony Music Group labels
List of Universal Music Group labels
List of Warner Music Group labels

By location
List of Bangladeshi record labels
List of record labels from Bristol
List of New Zealand record labels
List of Quebec record labels
List of West Coast hip hop record labels
List of independent UK record labels

See also